Living on Love Alone is a 2010 French drama film written and directed by Isabelle Czajka.

Cast 
 Anaïs Demoustier as Julie Bataille 
 Pio Marmaï as Ben 
 Laurent Poitrenaux as Bernard 
 Jean-Louis Coulloc'h as Jean
 Christine Brücher as Coco 
 Manuel Vallade as Mathieu 
 Adélaïde Leroux as Laure 
 Océane Mozas as Diane 
 Armonie Sanders as Charlotte 
 Jennifer Decker as Laura
 Gregory Herpe as Customs Officer

Accolades
The film received two nominations at the 36th César Awards, including Most Promising Actress for Anaïs Demoustier and Most Promising Actor for Pio Marmaï.

References

External links 
 

2010 films
2010 drama films
2010s French-language films
French drama films
2010s French films